Freedom of information in the United States relates to the public's ability to access goverment records, meetings, and other information. In the United States, freedom of information legislation exists at the federal level and at the local level.

Federal level
Since the founding of the United States, the public's right to know the affairs of their goverment has been foundational democracy. James Madison wrote during the United States Consitutional Convention, "The right of freely examining public characters and measures and free communication, is the only effective guardian of every other right."

Several federal laws have strengthened the public's ability to access public records.

Federal legislation

The most important was the Freedom of Information Act, signed into law on July 4, 1966, by President Lyndon Johnson.

 Administrative Procedure Act PL 79-404; 1946
 Freedom of Information Act PL 85-619; 1966
 Federal Advisory Committee Act PL 92-463; 1972
 Congressional Budget and Impoundment Control Act PL 93-344; 1974
 Government in the Sunshine Act PL 94-409; 1976
 Inspector General Act PL 95-452; 1978
 Ethics in Government Act PL 95-521; 1978
 Presidential Records Act PL 95-591; 1978
 Electronic Freedom of Information Act Amendments PL 104-231; 1996

Proposed legislation
 FOIA Oversight and Implementation Act of 2014 (H.R. 1211; 113th Congress) - would amend the FOIA to speed up the response time and ease of making a "FOIA request", among other changes.

Miscellaneous Authoritative Federal Sources
Executive Order 13233, drafted by Alberto R. Gonzales and issued by George W. Bush on November 1, 2001, is used to limit the FOIA by restricting access to the records of former presidents.
Executive Order 13392: Improving Agency Disclosure of Information.

U.S. Attorney General Memorandums

History

The Holder Memo is part of series of policy memos on how federal agencies should apply FOIA exemptions. Beginning in 1977 with Attorney General Griffin Bell, and continued by Attorney General William French Smith in 1981 and Attorney General Janet Reno in 1993, U.S. Department of Justice (DOJ) has announced how the executive branch should approach FOIA, its application, and DOJ's defense of agency's actions. In other words, DOJ's position on when they would defend in a FOIA suit has seesawed for about the last three decades.

Reno Memo

The Reno Memo established a "presumption" in favor of disclosure by providing that "it shall be the policy of the Department of Justice to defend the assertion of a FOIA exemption only in those cases where the agency reasonably foresees that disclosure would be harmful to an interest protected by that exemption". It encouraged all government agencies to review FOIA requests in a manner most favorable to openness and to release information, even though it might fall within one of the nine exemption categories, if no "foreseeable harm" would result from the disclosure. The goal was to achieve the "maximum responsible disclosure".

Ashcroft Memo

On October 12, 2001, Attorney General John Ashcroft issued a policy memorandum on FOIA to all federal executive agencies. The AG declared the Department of Justice (DOJ) would defend agencies' decisions to withhold documents from a FOIA requester under one of the statute's exemptions "unless they lack a sound legal basis or present an unwarranted risk of adverse impact on the ability of other agencies to protect other important records".

The Ashcroft Memorandum reversed the Reno standard. Agencies were told that in making discretionary FOIA decisions they should carefully consider the fundamental values behind the exemptions—national security, privacy, government's interests, etc.—and to lean in their favor whenever possible. The Ashcroft Memo with its "sound legal basis" standard encouraged (or at least seemed to support) greater use of FOIA exemptions by federal agency personnel.

AG Holder Memo

The Ashcroft Memo was rescinded by Attorney General Eric Holder on March 14, 2009. The AG Holder Memo appears to have reinstated the Reno Memo standard and extends the policy. The policy of the executive branch is to be open, responsive, transparent, and accountable. The current memo encourages the maximum disclosure possible in discretionary exemptions and to, whenever possible, reasonably segregate exempt information and release the rest.

State legislation

All fifty U.S. states and the District of Columbia also have freedom of information laws that govern the public's access to government records at state and local levels.  These laws go by many different names including Sunshine Laws, Public Records Laws, Open Records Laws, etc. Additionally, Open Meeting Laws govern the public's access to meetings of public officials or appointed boards.

All Freedom of Information style laws supports the ideal that in a democracy, people have the right to know the business of their government. However, the laws vary in scope and strength among jurisdictions. For example Florida's Sunshine Law creates both a statutory and consitutional right to access whereas many states only provide the statutory right. Additionally, while a state may have strong legislation the state's compliance with its own laws may negatively impact the public's ability to access records.

Freedom of Information Laws by US State

See also 
 Freedom of information laws by country
 Sunshine Week
 Open Goverment
 Declassification

Individuals 

 Jason Leopold
 Ryan Shapiro

U.S.
 Moynihan Commission on Government Secrecy
 McBurney v. Young
 Muckrock
 National Archives and Records Administration
 NSA warrantless surveillance controversy
 Patriot Act
 U.S. reclassification program
 United States v. Reynolds

References

External links
Sunshine Week
The Open Government Guide of the Reporters Committee for the Freedom of the Press.
The National Freedom of Information Coalition
The Joseph L. Brechner Center for Freedom of Information at the University of Florida College of Journalism and Communications

 
Law of the United States
Classified information